Rolf Magnusson (29 December 1921 – 16 June 2019) was a Swedish fencer. He competed in the individual and team foil events at the 1952 Summer Olympics.

References

External links
 

1921 births
2019 deaths
Swedish male foil fencers
Olympic fencers of Sweden
Fencers at the 1952 Summer Olympics
Sportspeople from Stockholm
20th-century Swedish people